CPD Bodedern Athletic F.C. is a Welsh football team based in the village of Bodedern, Anglesey. They play in the Ardal NW, the third tier of Welsh football.

History
The club was previously called Bodedern Football Club and were playing in the Cymru Alliance up to the 2006–07 season, but resigned from the league on 16 October 2007 due to a shortage of players. The club changed its name to Bodedern Athletic and took its reserves' place in the Gwynedd League.
In 2009–10 the club won promotion from the Gwynedd League as runners up.  The following season the club won back to back promotions finishing as runners up in the Welsh Alliance League Division 2.

The club was chosen to host matches during the 2019 Inter Games Football Tournament.

On 9 June 2022, it was announced that the club had been promoted to the tier 3 Ardal NW League for the 2022–23 season.

Club Officials
As of 2 April 2011.

Club honours

as Bodedern
1948–49 Anglesey League Division 2 Runners-Up
1977–78 Anglesey League Division 1 Winners
1979–80 Megan Cup Winners
1980–81 Anglesey League Division 1 Runners-Up, Megan Cup Winners, Dargie Cup Winners
1981–82 Anglesey League Division 2 Winners
1985–86 JW Lees Cup Runners-Up
1988–89 JW Lees Cup Runners-Up
1989–90 Anglesey League Division 1 Runners-Up, Megan Cup Winners
1990–91 Anglesey League Division 1 Winners, Elias Cup Winners
1998–99 Anglesey League Division 1 Winners, JW Lees Cup Winners, Megan Cup Winners, Dargie Cup Winners
1999–00 Barritt Cup Runners-Up
2000–01 Gwynedd Cup Winners, President's Cup Winners, Eryri Shield Winners
2001–02 Gwynedd League Winners, Gwynedd Cup Winners, President's Cup Winners, Eryri Shield Winners, Barritt Cup Runners-Up
2003–04 Barritt Cup Winners
2004–05 Welsh Alliance League Winners, Welsh Alliance Charity Cup Winners
2007–08 Gwynedd Cup Runners-Up

as Bodedern Athletic
2008–09 Eryri Shield Winners, Gwynedd Cup Runners-Up
2010–11 Take Stock Welsh Alliance Division Two Cup Winners
2021–22 North Wales Coast West Football League Premier Division Winners,
2021–22 North Wales Coast West Football League Premier Division Cup Runners-up

References

External links
 Official website

Football clubs in Wales
Welsh Alliance League clubs
Sport in Anglesey
Association football clubs established in 1946
1946 establishments in Wales
Bodedern
Cymru Alliance clubs
Anglesey League clubs
North Wales Coast Football League clubs
Gwynedd League clubs
Ardal Leagues clubs